Amy Metcalfe (born March 2, 1992) is a Canadian country music singer-songwriter from Red Deer, Alberta who signed to Royalty Records in 2014.

On April 27, 2015, Metcalfe released her debut EP, Inside Out, on Royalty Records with distribution from Sony Entertainment Canada. On June 22, she followed the EP by releasing a new single called "Whiskey Won't Fix Me" which is a duet with New Brunswick native Tristan Horncastle.

In 2017 Amy wrote and released a pop/edm song with Calgary DJ “Dj Kav” under the name AEM. The song was debuted in an opening slot with The Chainsmokers.

Discography

Studio albums

Singles

Music videos

References

External links
 

1992 births
Canadian women country singers
Living people
Musicians from Alberta
Musicians from Winnipeg
People from Red Deer, Alberta
Canadian country singer-songwriters
21st-century Canadian women singers